The Norrbotten archipelago is a group of Swedish islands in the north part of the Bay of Bothnia. A few of the islands have small permanent populations, but most are used only for recreation in the summer months. They are icebound during the winter.

Location

The north of the bay of Bothnia contains a large archipelago area.
The islands in the Swedish sector make up the Norrbotten archipelago.
It is divided into the archipelagos of Piteå (550 islands), Luleå (1,312 islands), Kalix (792 islands) and Haparanda (652 islands).
The largest island is Rånön in the Kalix archipelago.
As a result, the islands are growing in size but the waters and harbors are becoming shallower.

Climate

The waters around the archipelago are brackish, with less the 10% of the salt content of the Atlantic.
The sea freezes in January and remain frozen until March–April.

Gallery

See also
List of islands of Bothnian Bay

References
Citations

Sources

Swedish islands in the Baltic
Archipelagoes of Sweden
Landforms of Norrbotten County